Braunmühl is a German surname. Notable people with the surname include:

 Anton von Braunmühl (1853–1908), German mathematician
 Max von Braunmühl, German driver

German-language surnames